Étienne-Auguste Dossion (9 August 1770 – 3 October 1832) was a French playwright and poet.

Biography 
The son of an extra dancer at the Paris Opera, Dossion was "one of these writers-actors who contributed to the formation of the song repertoire, and one of the most fruitful." He was successively a notary clerk, a prompter and a Harlequin at the Théâtre du Vaudeville, a master of studies at Collège Sainte-Barbe, a bridges inspector, an employee at the Interior Ministry under Corbière, dismissed through the influence of Godiche because he always threw him tobacco puffs and he smelled of eau de vie, a launderer at Vaugirard, before finishing a day laborer and dying at the Hôtel-Dieu.

Works 
 Arlequin Pygmalion ou La bague enchantée, one-act parade, mingled with comédie en vaudevilles, Paris, an II (1794), in-8° 
 Romance sur la mort d’Agricole Viala 
 La Mouche du coche, ou Monsieur Fait-Tout, comédy in 1 act and in prose, 1812, Paris, 1802, in-8°, with Georges Duval 
 Couplets chantés à la section des Tuileries : le décadi 10 fructidor, l’an 2 de la République une & indivisible 
 Recueil des couplets d’annonce chantés sur le théâtre du Vaudeville, depuis le 21 avril 1792... jusqu’au 1er vendémiaire an XII, Paris, Capelle, an XII 
 Regrets d’un captif républicain français, d’être éloigné de sa patrie 
 Ode à l’Etre suprême, music by Dalayrac 
 À quelque chose malheur est bon, ou le Bien à côté du mal, Paris, Barba, 1807 
 Épitre au poëte cordonnier, Paris, Aubry, 1808, in-8°, 8 p.; Paris, 1808, in-8° 
 L’Éducation du fils d’Alcide, couplets sur la naissance du roi de Rome 
 Chant des berceuses du Roi de Rome 
 L’Élan du cœur. Opuscules à l’occasion du sacre de S. M. Charles X, 1825, in-8° 
 Stances sur la mort de Louis XVIII 
 Le Bordeaux, chanson bacchique (sic), pour le baptême de S. A. R. Mgr le Duc de Bordeaux 
 Le Cri des employés. Réponse à MM. de La Bourdonnaye, Castelbajac, de Villèle, Cornet d’Incourt, Dufourgerais, etc., Paris, Delaunay, 1817 
 Recueils des couplets d’annonces chantés sur le théâtre du Vaudeville; 1803, 1 vol. in-18 
 Histoire vraisemblable, 1807, in-8°, under the pseudonym Bernard 
 Guide du Constitutionnel, Paris, 1819, br. in-8°

References

Sources 
 Ferdinand Hoefer, Nouvelle Biographie générale, t.14, Paris, Firmin-Didot, 1855, (p. 666).

18th-century French dramatists and playwrights
19th-century French dramatists and playwrights
1770 births
Writers from Paris
1832 deaths